The Bentinck family is a prominent family belonging to Dutch, German and British nobility. Its members have served in the armed forces and as ambassadors and politicians, including as Governor General of India and as Prime Minister of the United Kingdom. The family is related to the British royal family through the maternal Cavendish-Bentinck line of Queen Elizabeth The Queen Mother.

History
The name Bentinck is a patronymic variation of the Old Germanic name Bento. The family is originally from the east of the Netherlands and is regarded as Uradel nobility, or noble from earliest times. The oldest known ancestor is Johan Bentinck, who owned land near Heerde and is mentioned in documents between 1343 and 1386.

An important British branch was founded by Hans Willem Bentinck, 1st Earl of Portland, who accompanied William Henry, Prince of Orange to England during the Glorious Revolution. The head of this line was initially given the title of Earl of Portland (later Duke of Portland). 

In 1732, the title of Count Bentinck (Graf Bentinck), of the Holy Roman Empire, was created for Willem Bentinck, the second surviving son of the 1st Earl of Portland. A Royal Licence of 1886 was created which allowed the use of this title in Britain. The Royal Warrant of 27 April 1932 abolished the use of foreign titles in the United Kingdom but extended the special allowance in 13 cases, including the Bentinck comital title "during the lives of the present holders, their heirs, and their heir's heir, provided such heir's heir is now in existence." That exception has now expired. Another branch with the title of count existed in the Netherlands, but it died out in the male line. 

The Dutch and British branches of the family continue to exist and belong to the Dutch nobility, German nobility and British nobility.

The Lordship of In- and Kniphausen
The counts of Bentinck were sovereign rulers of the Lordship of In- and Kniphausen, a territory of two parts in and around what is now the city of Wilhelmshaven. Originally subject to Brussels, the general reorganisation of the Holy Empire in 1803 (Reichsdeputationshauptschluss) granted Imperial immediacy until the dissolution of the Holy Empire in 1806. The Lordship maintained a precarious independence until 1810, when France annexed it and the whole German North Sea coast to enforce the Continental System. At the Congress of Vienna in 1815, the Lordship was denied admittance to the German Confederation in deference to Tsar Alexander I, who wished to see the territory annexed by his cousin, the Grand Duke of Oldenburg. Count Bentinck fought for his little state, however, and at the Congress of Aix-la-Chapelle in 1818, the Great Powers agreed that the Count's territory should be granted limited sovereignty.

The Frankfurt Convention of 10 July 1819 recognised In- and Kniphausen as sovereign within its own borders but under the protection of Oldenburg. The Treaty of Berlin on 8 June 1825 finalized the terms. In- and Kniphausen was permitted its own commercial flag, which its vessels bore on the high seas. Nevertheless, there was a long dispute between the Oldenburg and the Bentinck families in the latter's inheritance. This dispute was not ended until 1854 with a settlement in which the Bentinck family renounced its sovereignty for financial compensation and certain property rights. The Counts of Bentinck no longer claimed sovereignty over In- and Kniphausen.

Even before the final settlement, Oldenburg and Prussia had negotiated the Treaty of Jade of 1853 in which Oldenburg agreed to sell 340 hectares of Kniphausen territory to Prussia as a naval station for its North Sea Fleet. The cession became the city of Wilhelmshaven.

Today
The Dutch estate of the Bentinck family since the 16th century, is situated between the villages Heeten and Raalte in Overijssel. The area contains 5 square kilometres of forests and cultivated land. Nowadays, the family mainly earns its living by forestry, agriculture and renting holiday houses. The British branch of the family owns Bothal Castle (Bothal Estates) in Northumberland and Welbeck Abbey (Welbeck Estates), the ancestral seat of the Dukes of Portland in Nottinghamshire. 
Gary Ramsay Bentinck, Baron Bentinck (1964), is head of both the British baronial branch and the Dutch family.

Notable members 

 (c. 1397–1477)
Henrich Bentinck (died 1502)
 (c. 1468–1538), Dutch steward of the Veluwe region, and diplomat
Willem Bentinck (died 1576)
Eusebius Bentinck (died 1584)
Hendrik Bentinck (1563–1639)
Berent Bentinck (1597–1668)
Eusebius Borchart Bentinck (1643–1710)
Willem Bentinck (1673–1747)
Berend Hendrik Bentinck (1702–1773)
Derk Bentinck (1741–1813)
Berend Hendrik Wolter Jan Bentinck (1781–1849)
Walter Theodore Edward Bentinck (1840–1901)
Reginald Joseph Bentinck (1866–1937)
Moyra de Vere Bentinck (1917–1997), married to Dom Mintoff, Prime Minister of Malta
Yana Mintoff (born 1951)
Sir Rudolph Walter Bentinck (1868–1947), Royal Navy admiral
Wolf Walter Rudolph Bentinck (1903–1992)
Vivian Mark Bentinck (born 1945)
Alice Bentinck (born 1986), British entrepreneur
Bernhard Bentinck (1877–1931), English cricketer
Johan Volkier Baron Bentinck (1969-), consultant. 
 (1745–1781), Dutch naval hero
 (1751–1825), Dutch lieutenant-general
 (1753–1830), Dutch soldier and statesman
Hendrik Adolf Bentinck (1678–1734)
Willem Bentinck (1721–1784)
 (1764–1837), Dutch politician
 (1798–1868), Dutch politician
John Adolf Bentinck (1824–1917)
Johannes Adolf Bentinck (1857–1941)
Johannes Adolf Bentinck (1890–1953)
 (1916–2000), Dutch major-general
 (born 1940), Dutch judge
William Bentinck, 1st Earl of Portland (1649–1709), Dutch general and diplomat; English peer from 1689
Henry Bentinck, 1st Duke of Portland (1682–1726), Dutch-born British politician and colonial statesman
William Bentinck, 2nd Duke of Portland (1709–1762), British peer; married to Margaret Bentinck, Duchess of Portland (1715–1785), Cavendish heiress and bluestocking
William Cavendish-Bentinck, 3rd Duke of Portland (1738–1809), British politician, twice Prime Minister; married to Dorothy Bentinck, Duchess of Portland (1750–1794)
William Bentinck, 4th Duke of Portland (1768–1854), British politician
William Cavendish-Scott-Bentinck, Marquess of Titchfield (1796–1824), British politician
John Cavendish-Scott-Bentinck, 5th Duke of Portland (1800–1879), British aristocratic eccentric and recluse
Lord George Bentinck (1802–1848), British politician and racehorse owner
Lord Henry Bentinck (1804–1870), British politician
Lord William Bentinck (1774–1839), British soldier and statesman, Governor-General of India
Lord Charles Bentinck (1780–1826), British soldier and politician; married to Lady Charles Bentinck (1788–1875)
Charles Cavendish-Bentinck (1817–1865), Church of England clergyman; married Louisa Cavendish-Bentinck (1832–1918)
Cecilia Bowes-Lyon, Countess of Strathmore and Kinghorne, née Cavendish-Bentinck (1862–1938), maternal grandmother of Queen Elizabeth II
Arthur Cavendish-Bentinck (1819–1877), British lieutenant-general
William Cavendish-Bentinck, 6th Duke of Portland (1857–1943), British Conservative politician; married to Winifred Cavendish-Bentinck, Duchess of Portland (1863–1954)
William Cavendish-Bentinck, 7th Duke of Portland (1893–1977), British Conservative politician; married to Ivy Cavendish-Bentinck, Duchess of Portland (1887–1982)
Lady Anne Cavendish-Bentinck (1916–2008), British landowner, charity worker, art collector and horsewoman
Lady Ottoline Morrell, née Cavendish-Bentinck (1873–1938), British society hostess
Lord Frederick Guy Cavendish-Bentinck (1781–1828), British major-general
George Augustus Frederick Cavendish-Bentinck (1821–1891)
William George Cavendish-Bentinck (1854–1909), British Member of Parliament; married to Elizabeth Livingston Cavendish-Bentinck (1855–1943)
Frederick Cavendish-Bentinck (1856–1948); married Ruth Cavendish-Bentinck (1867–1953), suffragist
Ferdinand Cavendish-Bentinck, 8th Duke of Portland (1889–1980)
Victor Cavendish-Bentinck, 9th Duke of Portland (1897–1990), British diplomat and businessman
Lord Edward Bentinck (1744–1819)
Lord George Bentinck (1715–1759)
Mary Capel, Countess of Essex, née Bentinck (1679–1726)
Willem Bentinck van Rhoon, 1st Count Bentinck (1704–1774), Dutch politician; married Charlotte Sophie of Aldenburg (1715–1800), ruling Countess of Varel and Kniphausen
Christiaan Frederik Anton Willem Karel Bentinck (1734–1768)
, 2nd Count Bentinck (1762–1835), Dutch politician
Jan Carel van Aldenburg Bentinck (1763–1833)
Willem Frederik Christiaan Bentinck, 3rd Count Bentinck (1787–1855)
Carel Anton Ferdinand van Aldenburg Bentinck, 4th Count Bentinck (1792–1864)
Henry Bentinck, 5th Count Bentinck (1846–1903), resigned his rights to his younger brothers 1874
Count Robert Bentinck (1875–1932)
Henry Bentinck, 11th Earl of Portland, 10th Count Bentinck (1919–1997), British Army officer and non-conformist intellectual
Timothy Bentinck, 12th Earl of Portland, 11th Count Bentinck (born 1953), British actor and writer; married to Judy Bentinck (born 1952), British milliner
William Bentinck, Viscount Woodstock (born 1984), English social entrepreneur and speaker
Sir Charles Henry Bentinck (1879–1955), British diplomat who, after retirement, became an Anglican priest
Willem van Aldenburg Bentinck, 6th Count Bentinck (1848–1912)
Willem van Aldenburg Bentinck, 7th Count Bentinck (1880–1958)
 (1925–2013)
Carel Reinhard Adelbert van Aldenburg Bentinck (1853–1934)
 (1879–1975)
Godard Johan George Carel van Aldenburg Bentinck (1857–1940)
Carel van Aldenburg Bentinck, 8th Count Bentinck (1885–1964)
Adriaan van Aldenburg Bentinck, 9th Count Bentinck (1887–1968)
Sir Henry John William Bentinck (1796–1876), British general
Charles Ferdinand Bentinck (1764–1811), British colonial governor
Henry William Bentinck (1765–1820), British colonial governor
John Bentinck (1737–1775), Royal Navy captain, inventor and member of Parliament
William Bentinck (1764–1813), Royal Navy admiral, Governor of St Vincent and the Grenadines
George William Pierrepont Bentinck (1803–1886), British politician

Family tree

Legacy
Bentinck Island near Victoria, British Columbia at  may have been named after Lord George Bentinck.
North and South Bentinck Arms, inlets off Burke Channel, were named after William Cavendish-Bentinck, 3rd Duke of Portland by Captain Vancouver in 1793. North Bentinck Arm is significant in the history of Canada because it was here in 1793 that Sir Alexander Mackenzie completed the first recorded transcontinental crossing of North America by a European north of Mexico.
HMS Bentinck, Royal Navy ships named after Captain John Bentinck.
After Kaiser Wilhelm II fled to the Netherlands at the end of World War I, he was housed at Amerongen Castle, belonging to Count Bentinck.
HMS Portland (F79) is a type 23 frigate (Duke class) named after the Dukes of Portland. It is the eighth ship to hold the title, but the first to be named after the Portland family, rather than Portland Harbour.
Bentinck Street, near Cavendish Square in the West End of London, bears the family name.
Bentinckia, a genus of palms named after Lord William Bentinck, Governor General of British India.

References

External links 

 
Barons of the Netherlands
Dutch-language surnames
Toponymic surnames